This is a list of heads of state, heads of government, ministers and senior officials who have visited India.

1955–2003

2005–2009

2010

2011

2012

2013

2014

2015

2016

2017

2018

2019

2020

2021

2022

Republic day parade guests

Since 1950, India has been hosting head of state or government of another country as the state guest of honour for Republic Day celebrations in New Delhi. Numerous Heads of state have been the state guest of honour for the Republic Day parade.

References

India
Diplomatic visits